Fast and Furious is a 1927 American silent comedy film directed by Melville W. Brown and written by Raymond Cannon and Reginald Denny. The film stars Reginald Denny, Barbara Worth, Claude Gillingwater, and Armand Kaliz. The film was released on June 12, 1927 by Universal Pictures.

Cast
Reginald Denny as Tom Brown
Barbara Worth as Ethel
Claude Gillingwater as Smithfield
Armand Kaliz as Dupont
Lee Moran as Joe
Charles K. French as Hodge
Wilson Benge as Coachman
Robert E. Homans as Doctor
Kingsley Benedict as Shorty
Edgar Norton as Englishman

Preservation
A copy of Fast and Furious is housed at the Cineteca Italiana film archive in Italy.

References

External links

1927 comedy films
1927 films
American auto racing films
Silent American comedy films
American silent feature films
American black-and-white films
Universal Pictures films
Films directed by Melville W. Brown
1920s American films